Megaleledonidae is a family of octopuses in the superfamily Octopodoidea. It was formerly placed in the family Octopodidae sensu lato as the subfamily Megaleledoninae but more recent studies have raised this taxon as a valid family.

Reproduction

Megaleledonidae are known to produce both fewer and larger offspring than octopods that live in more tropical climates. The eggs produced by Megaleldonidae are typically large with very slow embryonic development that can take up the majority of their lifecycle including from months to years.

Genera
The following genera are included within the family Megaleledonidae:

 Adelieledone Allcock, Hochberg, Rodhouse & Thorpe, 2003
 Bathypurpurata Vecchione, Allcock & Piatkowski, 2005
 Bentheledone Robson, 1932
 Graneledone Joubin, 1918
 Megaleledone Iw. Taki, 1961
 Microeledone Norman, Hochberg & Boucher-Rodoni, 2004
 Pareledone Robson, 1932
 Praealtus Allcock, Collins, Piatkowski & Vecchione, 2004
 Tetracheledone Voss, 1955
 Thaumeledone Robson, 1930
 Velodona Chun, 1915
 Vosseledone Palacio, 1978

References

Cephalopod families